The 2011 Crédit Agricole Suisse Open Gstaad was a men's tennis tournament played on outdoor clay courts. It was the 44th edition of the Crédit Agricole Suisse Open Gstaad, and was part of the ATP World Tour 250 Series of the 2011 ATP World Tour. It took place at the Roy Emerson Arena in Gstaad, Switzerland, from 25 July through 31 July 2011.

Entrants

Seeds

*Seedings based on the July 18, 2011 rankings.

Other entrants
The following players received wildcards into the singles main draw:
  Stéphane Bohli
  Michael Lammer
  Alexander Sadecky

The following players received entry from the qualifying draw:

  Martin Fischer
  Peter Luczak
  Yann Marti
  João Souza

Finals

Singles

 Marcel Granollers defeated  Fernando Verdasco, 6–4, 3–6, 6–3
 It was Granollers' 1st title of the year and 2nd of his career.

Doubles

 František Čermák /  Filip Polášek defeated  Christopher Kas /  Alexander Peya, 6–3, 7–6(9–7)

External links
 Official website

Credit Agricole Suisse Open Gstaad
Swiss Open (tennis)
Credit Agricole Suisse Open Gstaad
2011 Crédit Agricole Suisse Open Gstaad